Akhteh Khaneh (also Romanized as Ākhteh Khāneh or Akhtekhaneh) is a village in Lakestan Rural District, in the Central District of Salmas County, West Azerbaijan Province, Iran. At the 2006 census, its population was 587, in 129 families.  There was an Armenian community in Akhteh Khaneh in the late 19th and 20th centuries. Today the population is Turkish.

The church 

The village is home to Surp Asdvadzadzin Church. It was built in 1342 and restored in 1891. "Asvadzadzin" means "Mother of God". It is built of rough stone masonry and kiln bricks and has three domes.

Location

The village is located roughly equidistant between Road 14 and Road 11. The nearest village is Bakhsh Kandi which is approximately 1 mile away.

Earthquake damage 

The village was affected by the 1930 Salmas earthquake.  All the buildings except the church were destroyed and there were four casualties. The relatively low number of casualties was because the villages felt the tremors so decided to sleep out of doors. The church remained standing but was left with fissures in the walls. It has not been restored.

References 

Populated places in Salmas County